Bonnie Hale Leman was the founder of Quilter's Newsletter Magazine, and one of the nation's first female magazine publishers.

Early life and education
Born September 28, 1926, in Purdin, Missouri, to Rex and Laura Hale, she left home for college at age 16. She graduated from Park College three years later. She moved to Denver in 1953 and  she met her husband, George Leman, while they were both pursuing master's degrees at the University of Denver.

A mother, teacher and freelance writer, Leman found her calling in the publishing business in 1969 when she founded "Quilter's Newsletter Magazine".

Quilter's Newsletter Magazine

Through the magazine, she helped revive and foster an appreciation of quilts as a great American art form that continues to this day. The publication garnered international praise and guided the revival of an iconic American art. Leman grew her magazine readership to more than 200,000 subscribers in more than 100 countries, as well as writing and publishing numerous books and other publications on quilt making. She traveled much of the world in the course of her career, and contributed to the growth of the quilt making art in many countries. She finally decided to retire in 1995.

External links
 Quilter's Newsletter Magazine - Official Site
 Bonnie Leman in Quilter's Hall of Fame
 Denver Post Obituary

1926 births
American magazine founders
American magazine publishers (people)
People from Linn County, Missouri
2010 deaths
American women in business
Park University alumni
University of Denver alumni
American women company founders
21st-century American women